Thomas Clausen (born 5 October 1949) is a Danish jazz pianist and composer.

Early life
Clausen was born on 5 October 1949 in Copenhagen. His brother was Bent Clausen. Thomas studied piano and composition.

Later life and career

Clausen was part of the band V8, led by Palle Mikkelborg and Alex Riel, from 1970 to 1975. He has recorded with Scandinavian jazz musicians and with Bob Brookmeyer, Eddie "Lockjaw" Davis, Dexter Gordon, Jackie McLean, Ben Webster and others. He has also led groups throughout his career.

Discography

As leader
 1982 Rain (Matrix Music Marketing)
 1985 The Shadow of Bill Evans (BMG)
 1988 She Touched Me (M-A)
 1989 Piano Music (M-A)
 1991 Café Noir featuring Gary Burton (Intermusic)
 1992 Flowers and Trees featuring Gary Burton (M•A Music)
 1998 Festa (with Celso Mendes) (Olufsen Records)
 1998 Turn Out the Stars (Storyville)
 1999 Follow the Moon (Stunt)
 2001 Prelude to a Kiss (Stunt)
 2002 My Favourite Things (Stunt)
 2002 Danske Sange (Stunt)
 2003 Balacobaco (Stunt)
 2007 Back to Basics (Stunt)
 2009 After the Carnaval (Stunt)
 2014 Morning... Dreaming... (with Steve Swallow) (Stunt)

Source:

As sideman
With Tim Berne
 Open, Coma (Screwgun, 2001)
With Francisco Cali
 The Voyage (Stunt, 2016)
With Eddie "Lockjaw" Davis
Swingin' Till the Girls Come Home (SteepleChase, 1976)
With Miles Davis
 Aura (Columbia, 1989)
With Dexter Gordon 
More Than You Know (SteepleChase, 1975)
With Jackie McLean
 Ode to Super (SteepleChase, 1973) with Gary Bartz

References

External links
Official site

1949 births
Living people
Danish jazz pianists
21st-century pianists
Stunt Records artists
Storyville Records artists
Olufsen Records artists